The Koenigsegg CCX is a mid-engine sports car manufactured by Swedish automotive manufacturer Koenigsegg Automotive AB. The project began with the aim of making a global car, designed and engineered to comply with global safety and environment regulations, particularly to enter the United States car market. To sell cars in the US, many alterations were made to the design of the CCR; the previously used Ford Modular engine was replaced by an in-house developed Koenigsegg engine designed to run on 91 octane fuel, readily available in the United States, and to meet the Californian emission standards.

The name CCX is an abbreviation for Competition Coupé X, the X commemorating the 10th anniversary (X being the Roman numeral for ten) of the completion and test drive of the first CC prototype in 1996.

Overview

Powertrain

The new engine is of all-aluminium construction made out of 356 aluminium with a T7 heat treatment to further enhance block integrity and cylinder bore chill during casting. Specifically created and cast for Koenigsegg by Grainger & Worrall, a casting specialist with F1 experience in drivetrain components, the engine was built, assembled and tested at their Ängelholm production plant. The engine is lubricated with a dry sump system with a separate oil pump and the pistons are cooled by means of an internal cooler that sprays oil onto them in order to run high cylinder pressure with 91 octane fuel
Available transmissions are a CIMA 6-speed manual and a 6-speed sequential manual transmission. Power is fed to the wheels through a torque-sensitive limited slip differential.

Body

The chassis is made from carbon fibre reinforced with kevlar and aluminium honeycomb like the previous models. While the body keeps the targa top body style and the dihedral synchro-helix actuation doors, it is completely reworked. There is a new front bumper design, enhanced brake cooling, fog lamps, US patented head lamps, a new fresh air intake on the bonnet that acts as ram air booster, air intakes behind the front wheels to enhance airflow and a glass window over the engine.

It also has a flat underside with venturi tunnels at the rear and an optional rear spoiler to improve downforce. The car is  longer to comply with the US rear impact regulations and to free space around the rear muffler.

Wheels and brakes
First in the industry carbon fibre wheels are optional equipment,  lighter than the standard forged alloy telephone-dial wheels, both using centre locking nuts.

Variants

CCXR

The CCXR is a more "environmentally friendly" version of the CCX, powered by the same engine, but converted to use E85 and E100 ethanol fuel, as well as standard 98 octane petrol. The CCXR required modified fuel injectors, upgraded fuel lines and piston rings, and a higher boost setting on the superchargers. In standard form, bodywork of the CCXR features heavily optimized aerodynamics, along with optional diffusers to enhance airflow, including an optional front splitter with an aerodynamic nolder. This is a direct result of the cooling properties of ethanol in the engine's combustion chambers along with the added boost, made possible by ethanol's higher octane rating when compared to gasoline. Due to the lower specific energy content of ethanol, the CCXR burns slightly more fuel than the CCX with a combined fuel consumption of  under the EU cycle.

CCX Edition, CCXR Edition, CCXR Special Edition

At the 2008 Geneva Motor Show, Koenigsegg presented two special edition models, the CCX Edition and the CCXR Edition, both fitted with a remapped, 4.8 L twin-supercharged V8 engine and limited to 2 and 4 units respectively.

The interior is also reworked and features; colour matched leather carpets, Koenigsegg Edition side step plates and Edition chronograph instrument cluster. All other extra equipment for the Koenigsegg CCX and CCXR Edition comes as standard which include optional carbon fibre wheels, a rearview camera, Satnav or Bluetooth, amplifiers, and a complete Inconell exhaust system.

Later, Koenigsegg also built 2 CCXR Special Edition cars which when compared to the old CCXR Edition had equipped with the double F1 wing, a revised aero package with a unique and larger front splitter and side winglets, wheel vents on top of the body, as well as Koenigsegg's first F1 Paddleshift system.

CCXR Trevita

The CCXR Trevita is a limited edition of the Koenigsegg CCXR featuring a diamond weave carbon fibre finish. Trevita is an abbreviation in Swedish and translates into "three whites". The Koenigsegg Proprietary Diamond Weave, fully developed by Koenigsegg, is a new and unique method to manufacture the carbon fibre used for the CCXR Trevita. By utilising this new and unique method, Koenigsegg managed to coat the fibres with a diamond finish. The fibre treatment is conducted carefully in small quantities, prior to further processing the pre-production material.

Initially, three CCXR Trevitas were planned to be produced, however, because of the complexity to make the special diamond weave carbon-fibre, only 2 were ever made, making it one of the rarest vehicles manufactured by Koenigsegg. Both cars featured the Koenigsegg Shimmering Diamond Weave bodywork, twin-deck carbon fibre rear wing, inconel exhaust system, carbon ceramic brakes with ABS, airbags, F1 paddle-shift gearbox, chrono instrument cluster, infotainment system, tire monitoring system and a hydraulic lifting system. The Trevita is also one of the most expensive sports cars, costing US$4.8 million.  One was owned by boxer Floyd Mayweather until it was sold in 2017 for 2.6 million dollars.

Specifications

Motorsport

In order to compete in the FIA GT Championship Koenigsegg created the CCGT race car, based on the production CC model range; making its debut appearance at the 2007 Geneva Motor Show and built to comply with the ACO and FIA regulations for the GT1 class.

The CCGT's engine is based on the unit used in the Koenigsegg CCX with the superchargers removed and the capacity increased to 5.0 L to compensate for the loss of power. The CCGT had over 600 kg downforce and over 600 hp normally aspirated, racing restricted hp. Due to the already lightweight construction of the road-going model it was based on, the weight was easily reduced under the minimum , which means that the Ballast can be placed optimally in order to meet the mandatory weight.

Two months after the car completed its first shakedown runs, the FIA GT1 regulations were suddenly changed, according to the altered regulations, carbon monocoques were disallowed and there had to be a minimum of 350 road cars produced per year of the model that was to compete, something that Koenigsegg was unable to achieve, prohibiting the CCGT from racing.

Production 
The CCX was produced between 2006 and 2010 and the total production amounted to 49 cars (30 CCX, 9 CCXR, 6 CCX/CCXR Edition, 2 CCXR Special Edition and 2 CCXR Trevita). One of them was a CCX used for Crash tests and the other was a CCXR which is still a factory test car. Some CCX cars have later been upgraded to CCXR-specifications.

Awards and recognition
 2009 Best Performing Green Exotic, duPont Registry
 One of the 10 Most Beautiful Cars by Forbes magazine

In 2007, the CCX was the fastest car to complete Top Gears Power Lap with a time of 1:17.6 (until it was beaten by the Ascari A10 with a time of 1:17.3).  The car originally lapped the circuit in 1:20.4, but was then fitted with an optional rear wing to provide downforce after The Stig spun it off the track at 130 mph due to a power steering failure. The Stig purportedly recommended this modification, predicting that the car would then be the fastest ever round Top Gear's track<ref name="topgear81"> – Jeremy Clarkson: "After the accident, Stig said he reckons this car would be 4 seconds faster than it was if it had a big wing on the back."</ref> but Koenigsegg later stated that the improvement was due to adjustments to the chassis and suspension settings and not the addition of the rear spoiler. Despite this, the Stig's spoiler-idea remained the credited reason for the improved lap time. The name of the car on the lap board is "Koeniggggsenisseggsegnignigsegigiseg CCX2 with the Top Gear wing", reportedly because none of the Top Gear'' presenters knew how to spell Koenigsegg, and also poking fun at the long and hard pronunciation of the manufacturer's name.

References

External links

 Official Koenigsegg site
 Unofficial Koenigsegg Registry

CCX
Rear mid-engine, rear-wheel-drive vehicles
Sports cars
Flexible-fuel vehicles
Grand tourer racing cars
Cars introduced in 2006